Kai Lukas Stratznig (born 15 April 2002) is an Austrian professional footballer who plays as a midfielder, most recently for Wolfsberger AC.

Club career
Born in Spittal an der Drau, Stratznig grew up in Mühldorf and began his career at the local club SC Mühldorf. Ahead of the 2016–17 season, he joined the academy of Wolfsberger AC. In March 2019, he made his debut for the reserve team in the Austrian Regionalliga against FC Wels. By the end of the 2018–19 season, he had made 11 appearances at the third level.

In June 2020, Stratznig was included in the first-team squad for the first time for the match against Sturm Graz. He made his Bundesliga debut the same month when he came on as a substitute for Romano Schmid in the 75th minute of a 4–2 loss to TSV Hartberg on 10 June. He made his first appearance in the starting eleven on 21 June in a 2–2 draw against Red Bull Salzburg.

He suffered an ankle injury in a game against Red Bull Salzburg in February 2022, ruling him out for an extended period. Stratznig left Wolfsberger AC as his contract expired at the end of the 2021–22 season, after declining an extension offer by the club.

International career
In March 2021, Stratznig made his international debut for the Austria U21 team against Saudi Arabia.

Career statistics

Club

References

2002 births
People from Spittal an der Drau
Footballers from Carinthia (state)
Living people
Austrian footballers
Austria under-21 international footballers
Association football midfielders
Wolfsberger AC players
Austrian Regionalliga players
Austrian Football Bundesliga players